The 1962 Philadelphia Phillies season was the 80th season for the National League franchise.  The Phillies finished the season in seventh place in the newly expanded National League with a record of 81–80, a dramatic improvement of  games over the 47–107 mark of the previous season. Gene Mauch managed the Phillies, who played their home games at Connie Mack Stadium.

Offseason 
 October 10, 1961: 1961 Major League Baseball expansion draft
Choo-Choo Coleman was drafted from the Phillies by the New York Mets.
Bob Smith was drafted from the Phillies by the New York Mets.
 November 28, 1961: Charley Smith and John Buzhardt were traded by the Phillies to the Chicago White Sox for Roy Sievers.
 Prior to 1962 season: Rubén Gómez was acquired from the Phillies by the Cleveland Indians.

Preseason 
The Phillies held spring training in Clearwater, Florida where the team had trained since 1947, and played exhibition games at Jack Russell Stadium.

While the Phillies' White players and club officials had been welcome to stay at Clearwater's Jack Tar Harrison Hotel, the Hotel refused service to the team's Black players who boarded in private homes. On March 10, 1962, the Phillies moved their entire team including White and Black players into the Rocky Point Motel located between Clearwater and Tampa. 

The Phillies had sold pitcher Robin Roberts to the New York Yankees shortly after the 1961 season. On February 6, 1962, the Phillies announced that Roberts' uniform number 36 would be retired by the team on March 21, 1962, when the Yankees would visit Clearwater to play the Phillies in a spring training game. It was the first uniform number to be retired by the organization and only the second time (after the Yankees retired Babe Ruth's number 3) that a uniform number was retired while the player was still active. Roberts started for the Yankees in the spring game, gave up four runs in three innings, and was the winning pitcher as the Yankees won 13–10.

Regular season

'Phillies Special' Rail Accident 
The Pennsylvania Railroad ran a line from Harrisburg to Philadelphia that often carried fans from central Pennsylvania to games at Connie Mack Stadium. It was advertised on Phillies radio broadcasts as the "Phillies Special". At 5:07 PM on July 28, 1962, en route to the Phillies 8:05 PM game against the Pittsburgh Pirates, four cars of Pennsylvania Railroad's Extra 4878 East derailed 3.7 miles east of Harrisburg at Steelton, Pennsylvania. Three of the cars toppled down a 30-foot embankment to the Susquehanna River. There were 19 fatalities and 119 were injured. The following day, on Sunday, July 29, 1962, at Connie Mack, the Phillies honored the victims with a moment of silence prior to the game's start. The Pennsylvania Railroad would later report the track was out of alignment.

Season standings

Record vs. opponents

Opening Day lineup 
Tony Taylor, 2B
Johnny Callison, RF
Tony González, CF
Roy Sievers, 1B
Wes Covington, LF
Don Demeter, 3B
Clay Dalrymple, C
Rubén Amaro, SS
Art Mahaffey, P

Notable transactions 
 September 12, 1962: Johnny Briggs was signed as an amateur free agent by the Phillies.

Game log

|- style="background:#bfb"
| 1 || April 9 || @ Reds || 12–4 || Art Mahaffey (1–0) || Joey Jay (0–1) || None || 28,506 || 1–0
|- style="background:#fbb"
| 2 || April 10 || @ Pirates || 0–6 || Bob Friend (1–0) || Jim Owens (0–1) || None || 28,813 || 1–1
|- style="background:#bbb"
| – || April 11 || @ Pirates || colspan=6 | Postponed (rain); Makeup: July 5
|- style="background:#bfb"
| 3 || April 13 || Colt .45s || 3–2 || Jack Hamilton (1–0) || Turk Farrell (0–1) || None || 12,633 || 2–1
|- style="background:#bfb"
| 4 || April 14 || Colt .45s || 3–0 || Art Mahaffey (2–0) || Ken Johnson (0–1) || None || 2,732 || 3–1
|- style="background:#bbb"
| – || April 15 (1) || Colt .45s || colspan=6 | Postponed (rain); Makeup: June 26 as a traditional double-header
|- style="background:#bbb"
| – || April 15 (2) || Colt .45s || colspan=6 | Postponed (rain); Makeup: July 11
|- style="background:#fbb"
| 5 || April 16 || Cardinals || 6–12 || Ernie Broglio (1–0) || Don Ferrarese (0–1) || None || 3,895 || 3–2
|- style="background:#bbb"
| – || April 17 || Cardinals || colspan=6 | Postponed (cold); Makeup: June 22 as a traditional double-header
|- style="background:#fbb"
| 6 || April 18 || Pirates || 3–4 || Earl Francis (1–0) || Jack Hamilton (1–1) || None || 7,284 || 3–3
|- style="background:#fbb"
| 7 || April 19 || Pirates || 3–6 || Al McBean (1–0) || Art Mahaffey (2–1) || Jack Lamabe (1) || 8,427 || 3–4
|- style="background:#bfb"
| 8 || April 21 || @ Colt .45s || 3–1 || Cal McLish (1–0) || Ken Johnson (0–2) || Jack Baldschun (1) || 21,841 || 4–4
|- style="background:#bfb"
| 9 || April 22 || @ Colt .45s || 4–3 || Jim Owens (1–1) || Dave Giusti (0–1) || Jack Baldschun (2) || 13,130 || 5–4
|- style="background:#bbb"
| – || April 23 || @ Colt .45s || colspan=6 | Postponed (wet grounds); Makeup: July 17 as a traditional double-header
|- style="background:#fbb"
| 10 || April 24 || @ Braves || 1–2 || Warren Spahn (2–2) || Art Mahaffey (2–2) || None || 6,898 || 5–5
|- style="background:#fbb"
| 11 || April 25 || @ Braves || 2–7 || Ron Piché (1–0) || Chris Short (0–1) || None || 7,306 || 5–6
|- style="background:#fbb"
| 12 || April 26 || @ Braves || 4–10 || Bob Hendley (2–1) || Jack Hamilton (1–2) || Hank Fischer (1) || 6,007 || 5–7
|- style="background:#bfb"
| 13 || April 27 || @ Mets || 11–9 || Cal McLish (2–0) || Roger Craig (0–3) || Jack Baldschun (3) || 9,043 || 6–7
|- style="background:#fbb"
| 14 || April 28 || @ Mets || 6–8 || Roger Craig (1–3) || Frank Sullivan (0–1) || None || 10,492 || 6–8
|- style="background:#fbb"
| 15 || April 29 (1) || @ Mets || 0–8 || Al Jackson (1–2) || Art Mahaffey (2–3) || None || see 2nd game || 6–9
|- style="background:#bfb"
| 16 || April 29 (2) || @ Mets || 10–2 || Bobby Locke (1–0) || Sherman Jones (0–4) || Jack Baldschun (4) || 19,925 || 7–9
|- style="background:#bfb"
| 17 || April 30 || Braves || 6–4 || Jack Hamilton (2–2) || Warren Spahn (2–3) || Jack Baldschun (5) || 3,931 || 8–9
|-

|- style="background:#bbb"
| – || May 1 || Braves || colspan=6 | Postponed (cold weather, wet grounds); Makeup: July 20 (22) as a traditional double-header
|- style="background:#bbb"
| – || May 2 || Braves || colspan=6 | Postponed (cold weather, rain); Makeup: July 22 (20) as a traditional double-header
|- style="background:#bfb"
| 18 || May 3 || Braves || 9–8 || Jack Baldschun (1–0) || Hank Fischer (0–1) || None || 9,983 || 9–9
|- style="background:#bfb"
| 19 || May 4 || Mets || 6–5 || Dallas Green (1–0) || Ken MacKenzie (0–1) || None || 16,393 || 10–9
|- style="background:#bfb"
| 20 || May 5 || Mets || 2–1 || Cal McLish (3–0) || Al Jackson (1–3) || Jack Baldschun (6) || 7,993 || 11–9
|- style="background:#fbb"
| 21 || May 6 (1) || Mets || 5–7 (12) || Craig Anderson (1–1) || Jack Baldschun (1–1) || Roger Craig (1) || 28,215 || 11–10
|- style="background:#bbb"
| – || May 6 (2) || Mets || colspan=6 | Postponed (Sunday curfew); Makeup: June 6 as a traditional double-header
|- style="background:#bfb"
| 22 || May 8 || @ Reds || 6–4 || Chris Short (1–1) || Jim O'Toole (2–4) || Jack Baldschun (7) || 5,134 || 12–10
|- style="background:#fbb"
| 23 || May 9 || @ Reds || 4–7 || Bob Purkey (5–0) || Art Mahaffey (2–4) || None || 3,304 || 12–11
|- style="background:#bfb"
| 24 || May 11 || @ Cubs || 12–2 || Jack Hamilton (3–2) || Dick Ellsworth (2–4) || None || 1,004 || 13–11
|- style="background:#fbb"
| 25 || May 12 || @ Cubs || 8–9 || Don Elston (2–0) || Jack Baldschun (1–2) || None || 2,668 || 13–12
|- style="background:#fbb"
| 26 || May 13 (1) || @ Cubs || 7–8 || Barney Schultz (2–1) || Jack Baldschun (1–3) || None || see 2nd game || 13–13
|- style="background:#fbb"
| 27 || May 13 (2) || @ Cubs || 5–8 || Barney Schultz (3–1) || Chris Short (1–2) || Dick Ellsworth (1) || 4,927 || 13–14
|- style="background:#fbb"
| 28 || May 15 || Reds || 2–3 || Joey Jay (5–3) || Art Mahaffey (2–5) || Ted Wills (1) || 8,177 || 13–15
|- style="background:#fbb"
| 29 || May 16 || Reds || 5–6 || Jim Brosnan (1–1) || Frank Sullivan (0–2) || None || 5,350 || 13–16
|- style="background:#bfb"
| 30 || May 17 || Reds || 9–6 || Cal McLish (4–0) || Jim O'Toole (3–5) || Chris Short (1) || 8,674 || 14–16
|- style="background:#fbb"
| 31 || May 18 || Cubs || 8–11 || Dick Ellsworth (3–4) || Jack Baldschun (1–4) || None || 8,425 || 14–17
|- style="background:#bfb"
| 32 || May 19 || Cubs || 7–5 || Art Mahaffey (3–5) || Glen Hobbie (0–5) || None || 3,054 || 15–17
|- style="background:#fbb"
| 33 || May 20 (1) || Cubs || 4–6 || Cal Koonce (2–0) || Jim Owens (1–2) || Bob Anderson (2) || see 2nd game || 15–18
|- style="background:#fbb"
| 34 || May 20 (2) || Cubs || 2–11 || Bob Buhl (2–2) || Jack Hamilton (3–3) || None || 9,522 || 15–19
|- style="background:#fbb"
| 35 || May 21 || @ Cardinals || 1–4 || Ray Washburn (3–0) || Dennis Bennett (0–1) || Bobby Shantz (1) || 6,956 || 15–20
|- style="background:#fbb"
| 36 || May 22 || @ Cardinals || 2–6 || Bob Gibson (6–2) || Paul Brown (0–1) || None || 7,270 || 15–21
|- style="background:#bfb"
| 37 || May 23 || @ Giants || 10–7 || Art Mahaffey (4–5) || Mike McCormick (1–2) || Jack Baldschun (8) || 7,314 || 16–21
|- style="background:#fbb"
| 38 || May 24 || @ Giants || 4–7 || Stu Miller (2–1) || Cal McLish (4–1) || None || 5,680 || 16–22
|- style="background:#fbb"
| 39 || May 25 || @ Giants || 7–10 || Billy Pierce (7–0) || Jack Hamilton (3–4) || Stu Miller (4) || 11,538 || 16–23
|- style="background:#fbb"
| 40 || May 26 || @ Dodgers || 3–6 || Sandy Koufax (6–2) || Dallas Green (1–1) || None || 18,071 || 16–24
|- style="background:#fbb"
| 41 || May 27 (1) || @ Dodgers || 2–5 || Stan Williams (4–1) || Paul Brown (0–2) || Ron Perranoski (3) || see 2nd game || 16–25
|- style="background:#fbb"
| 42 || May 27 (2) || @ Dodgers || 1–2 || Don Drysdale (7–3) || Art Mahaffey (4–6) || None || 34,378 || 16–26
|- style="background:#fbb"
| 43 || May 30 (1) || Giants || 3–4 (12) || Stu Miller (3–1) || Chris Short (1–3) || None || see 2nd game || 16–27
|- style="background:#fbb"
| 44 || May 30 (2) || Giants || 2–5 || Mike McCormick (2–2) || Jack Hamilton (3–5) || Stu Miller (7) || 29,739 || 16–28
|- style="background:#bfb"
| 45 || May 31 || Giants || 2–1 || Art Mahaffey (5–6) || Billy O'Dell (5–3) || None || 9,393 || 17–28
|-

|- style="background:#fbb"
| 46 || June 1 (1) || Dodgers || 4–11 || Stan Williams (5–1) || Paul Brown (0–3) || Ron Perranoski (5) || see 2nd game || 17–29
|- style="background:#fbb"
| 47 || June 1 (2) || Dodgers || 5–8 || Don Drysdale (8–3) || Dallas Green (1–2) || Larry Sherry (3) || 24,799 || 17–30
|- style="background:#bfb"
| 48 || June 2 || Dodgers || 7–0 || Dennis Bennett (1–1) || Phil Ortega (0–1) || None || 13,141 || 18–30
|- style="background:#bfb"
| 49 || June 3 || Dodgers || 7–5 || Chris Short (2–3) || Johnny Podres (3–4) || Paul Brown (1) || 9,931 || 19–30
|- style="background:#fbb"
| 50 || June 4 || Dodgers || 3–6 || Sandy Koufax (8–2) || Art Mahaffey (5–7) || None || 15,163 || 19–31
|- style="background:#bbb"
| – || June 5 || Mets || colspan=6 | Postponed (rain); Makeup: August 28 as a traditional double-header
|- style="background:#bfb"
| 51 || June 6 (1) || Mets || 2–0 || Cal McLish (5–1) || Roger Craig (2–8) || None || see 2nd game || 20–31
|- style="background:#bfb"
| 52 || June 6 (2) || Mets || 2–1 || Art Mahaffey (6–7) || Al Jackson (2–7) || None || 8,681 || 21–31
|- style="background:#bfb"
| 53 || June 8 || @ Reds || 10–3 || Dennis Bennett (2–1) || Johnny Klippstein (1–1) || None || 16,991 || 22–31
|- style="background:#fbb"
| 54 || June 9 || @ Reds || 1–5 || Bob Purkey (10–1) || Paul Brown (0–4) || Bill Henry (4) || 6,797 || 22–32
|- style="background:#bfb"
| 55 || June 10 (1) || @ Reds || 7–5 || Jack Baldschun (2–4) || Joey Jay (8–6) || None || see 2nd game || 23–32
|- style="background:#fbb"
| 56 || June 10 (2) || @ Reds || 2–9 || Jim Maloney (1–0) || Art Mahaffey (6–8) || Jim Brosnan (4) || 17,471 || 23–33
|- style="background:#bfb"
| 57 || June 11 || @ Cardinals || 8–5 || Jack Hamilton (4–5) || Curt Simmons (6–3) || Dallas Green (1) || 6,954 || 24–33
|- style="background:#fbb"
| 58 || June 12 || @ Cardinals || 2–3 || Don Ferrarese (1–2) || Paul Brown (0–5) || None || 8,092 || 24–34
|- style="background:#fbb"
| 59 || June 13 || @ Cardinals || 1–6 || Bob Gibson (8–4) || Dennis Bennett (2–2) || None || 10,933 || 24–35
|- style="background:#bfb"
| 60 || June 15 || Reds || 13–8 || Art Mahaffey (7–8) || Jim Maloney (1–1) || Chris Short (2) || 15,326 || 25–35
|- style="background:#bfb"
| 61 || June 16 || Reds || 4–3 || Chris Short (3–3) || Bill Henry (2–1) || None || 13,288 || 26–35
|- style="background:#bfb"
| 62 || June 17 || Reds || 7–2 || Jack Baldschun (3–4) || Jim O'Toole (4–8) || None || 7,936 || 27–35
|- style="background:#fbb"
| 63 || June 19 || Cubs || 5–9 || Dave Gerard (2–0) || Chris Short (3–4) || None || 6,464 || 27–36
|- style="background:#bbb"
| – || June 20 || Cubs || colspan=6 | Postponed (rain); Makeup: September 19 as a traditional double-header
|- style="background:#bfb"
| 64 || June 21 || Cubs || 3–0 || Art Mahaffey (8–8) || Dick Ellsworth (4–10) || None || 7,533 || 28–36
|- style="background:#fbb"
| 65 || June 22 (1) || Cardinals || 3–7 || Larry Jackson (6–7) || Paul Brown (0–6) || Lindy McDaniel (4) || see 2nd game || 28–37
|- style="background:#bfb"
| 66 || June 22 (2) || Cardinals || 11–3 || Jim Owens (2–2) || Ernie Broglio (2–3) || None || 27,069 || 29–37
|- style="background:#fbb"
| 67 || June 23 || Cardinals || 1–9 || Bob Gibson (9–5) || Bill Smith (0–1) || None || 5,893 || 29–38
|- style="background:#bfb"
| 68 || June 24 (1) || Cardinals || 3–1 || Chris Short (4–4) || Ray Sadecki (4–4) || None || see 2nd game || 30–38
|- style="background:#fbb"
| 69 || June 24 (2) || Cardinals || 1–5 || Curt Simmons (7–4) || Dennis Bennett (2–3) || Lindy McDaniel (5) || 20,561 || 30–39
|- style="background:#bfb"
| 70 || June 25 || Colt .45s || 4–3 || Dallas Green (2–2) || Hal Woodeshick (2–5) || None || 8,087 || 31–39
|- style="background:#bfb"
| 71 || June 26 (1) || Colt .45s || 2–0 || Jack Hamilton (5–5) || Turk Farrell (5–8) || None || see 2nd game || 32–39
|- style="background:#bfb"
| 72 || June 26 (2) || Colt .45s || 6–4 || Art Mahaffey (9–8) || Jim Golden (5–5) || None || 18,707 || 33–39
|- style="background:#bfb"
| 73 || June 28 || @ Giants || 7–2 || Bill Smith (1–1) || Juan Marichal (11–5) || None || 7,174 || 34–39
|- style="background:#fbb"
| 74 || June 29 || @ Giants || 3–4 (12) || Billy O'Dell (9–6) || Jack Baldschun (3–5) || None || 11,088 || 34–40
|- style="background:#fbb"
| 75 || June 30 || @ Giants || 3–8 || Bobby Bolin (2–0) || Cal McLish (5–2) || Stu Miller (10) || 11,716 || 34–41
|-

|- style="background:#fbb"
| 76 || July 1 || @ Giants || 4–5 || Don Larsen (4–1) || Art Mahaffey (9–9) || Stu Miller (11) || 17,612 || 34–42
|- style="background:#fbb"
| 77 || July 2 (1) || @ Dodgers || 1–5 || Johnny Podres (4–6) || Jack Hamilton (5–6) || Larry Sherry (6) || see 2nd game || 34–43
|- style="background:#fbb"
| 78 || July 2 (2) || @ Dodgers || 0–4 || Stan Williams (7–4) || Bill Smith (1–2) || None || 28,316 || 34–44
|- style="background:#fbb"
| 79 || July 4 (1) || @ Dodgers || 1–16 || Sandy Koufax (12–4) || Chris Short (4–5) || None || see 2nd game || 34–45
|- style="background:#fbb"
| 80 || July 4 (2) || @ Dodgers || 3–7 || Joe Moeller (6–5) || Dennis Bennett (2–4) || Ed Roebuck (5) || 39,322 || 34–46
|- style="background:#fbb"
| 81 || July 5 || @ Pirates || 0–5 || Al McBean (8–5) || Jim Owens (2–3) || None || 13,623 || 34–47
|- style="background:#bfb"
| 82 || July 6 || @ Pirates || 6–2 || Art Mahaffey (10–9) || Bob Friend (8–9) || None || 15,836 || 35–47
|- style="background:#fbb"
| 83 || July 7 || @ Pirates || 4–6 || Roy Face (5–1) || Chris Short (4–6) || None || 8,781 || 35–48
|- style="background:#bfb"
| 84 || July 8 (1) || @ Pirates || 8–4 || Jack Baldschun (4–5) || Vern Law (7–4) || None || see 2nd game || 36–48
|- style="background:#fbb"
| 85 || July 8 (2) || @ Pirates || 5–6 || Tom Sturdivant (4–3) || Bill Smith (1–3) || Roy Face (17) || 16,147 || 36–49
|- style="background:#bbcaff;"
| – || July 10 ||colspan="7" |1962 Major League Baseball All-Star Game at District of Columbia Stadium in Washington
|- style="background:#bfb"
| 86 || July 11 || Colt .45s || 6–1 || Art Mahaffey (11–9) || Hal Woodeshick (3–7) || None || 3,441 || 37–49
|- style="background:#fbb"
| 87 || July 12 || Giants || 3–5 || Jack Sanford (10–6) || Jack Hamilton (5–7) || Stu Miller (13) || 17,151 || 37–50
|- style="background:#bfb"
| 88 || July 13 || Giants || 3–2 || Dennis Bennett (3–4) || Billy O'Dell (10–8) || None || 18,693 || 38–50
|- style="background:#bfb"
| 89 || July 14 || Giants || 6–5 (10) || Jack Baldschun (5–5) || Stu Miller (4–5) || None || 7,716 || 39–50
|- style="background:#fbb"
| 90 || July 15 (1) || Dodgers || 1–9 || Johnny Podres (5–7) || Bill Smith (1–4) || None || see 2nd game || 39–51
|- style="background:#bfb"
| 91 || July 15 (2) || Dodgers || 2–1 || Art Mahaffey (12–9) || Phil Ortega (0–2) || None || 34,907 || 40–51
|- style="background:#bfb"
| 92 || July 17 (1) || @ Colt .45s || 3–0 || Jack Hamilton (6–7) || Russ Kemmerer (2–2) || Jack Baldschun (9) || see 2nd game || 41–51
|- style="background:#bfb"
| 93 || July 17 (2) || @ Colt .45s || 8–2 || Cal McLish (6–2) || Turk Farrell (5–12) || Dennis Bennett (1) || 8,115 || 42–51
|- style="background:#bfb"
| 94 || July 18 || @ Colt .45s || 6–2 || Dallas Green (3–2) || Bob Bruce (6–4) || None || 5,140 || 43–51
|- style="background:#bfb"
| 95 || July 19 || @ Colt .45s || 6–2 || Chris Short (5–6) || Hal Woodeshick (4–8) || Jack Baldschun (10) || 5,017 || 44–51
|- style="background:#fbb"
| 96 || July 20 (1) || Braves || 5–7 || Jack Curtis (3–4) || Dennis Bennett (3–5) || None || see 2nd game || 44–52
|- style="background:#bfb"
| 97 || July 20 (2) || Braves || 3–2 || Art Mahaffey (13–9) || Bob Hendley (6–7) || None || 24,353 || 45–52
|- style="background:#fbb"
| 98 || July 21 || Braves || 1–8 || Warren Spahn (9–11) || Jack Hamilton (6–8) || None || 11,689 || 45–53
|- style="background:#fbb"
| 99 || July 22 (1) || Braves || 10–11 || Don Nottebart (1–2) || Jack Baldschun (5–6) || None || see 2nd game || 45–54
|- style="background:#fbb"
| 100 || July 22 (2) || Braves || 2–5 || Denny Lemaster (1–1) || Dallas Green (3–3) || Claude Raymond (3) || 11,010 || 45–55
|- style="background:#bfb"
| 101 || July 23 || @ Cubs || 5–3 || Jack Baldschun (6–6) || Don Elston (3–6) || Jack Hamilton (1) || 6,699 || 46–55
|- style="background:#fbb"
| 102 || July 24 || @ Cubs || 3–5 || Glen Hobbie (3–9) || Bill Smith (1–5) || Don Cardwell (1) || 5,403 || 46–56
|- style="background:#fbb"
| 103 || July 25 || @ Cubs || 2–5 || Bob Buhl (7–8) || Dennis Bennett (3–6) || Dave Gerard (3) || 6,292 || 46–57
|- style="background:#bfb"
| 104 || July 27 (1) || Pirates || 5–3 || Dallas Green (4–3) || Harvey Haddix (7–5) || Chris Short (3) || see 2nd game || 47–57
|- style="background:#fbb"
| 105 || July 27 (2) || Pirates || 1–4 || Bob Friend (11–10) || Jack Hamilton (6–9) || Roy Face (18) ||  || 47–58
|- style="background:#bfb"
| 106 || July 28 || Pirates || 9–2 || Art Mahaffey (14–9) || Earl Francis (5–7) || None || 12,450 || 48–58
|- style="background:#bfb"
| 107 || July 29 || Pirates || 8–1 || Cal McLish (7–2) || Al McBean (10–7) || None || 8,502 || 49–58
|- style="background:#bbcaff;"
| – || July 30 ||colspan="7" |1962 Major League Baseball All-Star Game at Wrigley Field in Chicago
|-

|- style="background:#bfb"
| 108 || August 1 || @ Mets || 11–9 || Dennis Bennett (4–6) || Al Jackson (5–13) || Jack Baldschun (11) || 8,681 || 50–58
|- style="background:#bfb"
| 109 || August 2 || @ Mets || 9–4 || Art Mahaffey (15–9) || Craig Anderson (3–12) || None || 6,042 || 51–58
|- style="background:#bbb"
| – || August 3 || @ Braves || colspan=6 | Postponed (rain); Makeup: August 4 as a traditional double-header
|- style="background:#fbb"
| 110 || August 4 (1) || @ Braves || 2–6 || Bob Hendley (8–7) || Dallas Green (4–4) || None || see 2nd game || 51–59
|- style="background:#fbb"
| 111 || August 4 (2) || @ Braves || 3–7 || Claude Raymond (4–2) || Jack Baldschun (6–7) || None || 9,474 || 51–60
|- style="background:#fbb"
| 112 || August 5 || @ Braves || 1–8 || Warren Spahn (11–11) || Dennis Bennett (4–7) || None || 11,664 || 51–61
|- style="background:#fbb"
| 113 || August 6 || @ Giants || 2–9 || Billy Pierce (10–3) || Dallas Green (4–5) || None || 6,222 || 51–62
|- style="background:#fbb"
| 114 || August 7 || @ Giants || 2–4 || Juan Marichal (14–8) || Art Mahaffey (15–10) || None || 8,531 || 51–63
|- style="background:#fbb"
| 115 || August 8 || @ Dodgers || 1–3 || Stan Williams (11–7) || Jack Hamilton (6–10) || None || 34,729 || 51–64
|- style="background:#fbb"
| 116 || August 9 || @ Dodgers || 3–8 || Ed Roebuck (8–0) || Dennis Bennett (4–8) || Ron Perranoski (12) || 32,226 || 51–65
|- style="background:#fbb"
| 117 || August 10 || @ Cardinals || 4–7 || Bobby Shantz (4–2) || Chris Short (5–7) || None || 13,408 || 51–66
|- style="background:#bfb"
| 118 || August 11 || @ Cardinals || 11–3 || Art Mahaffey (16–10) || Larry Jackson (9–10) || None || 9,216 || 52–66
|- style="background:#bfb"
| 119 || August 12 (1) || @ Cardinals || 7–3 || Cal McLish (8–2) || Ernie Broglio (9–5) || None || see 2nd game || 53–66
|- style="background:#bfb"
| 120 || August 12 (2) || @ Cardinals || 9–7 || Dallas Green (5–5) || Lindy McDaniel (2–7) || Dennis Bennett (2) || 17,088 || 54–66
|- style="background:#bfb"
| 121 || August 14 || @ Mets || 3–1 (15) || Jack Baldschun (7–7) || Al Jackson (6–15) || None || 5,351 || 55–66
|- style="background:#bfb"
| 122 || August 15 (1) || @ Mets || 9–3 || Dennis Bennett (5–8) || Bob L. Miller (0–9) || Cal McLish (1) || see 2nd game || 56–66
|- style="background:#bfb"
| 123 || August 15 (2) || @ Mets || 8–7 (13) || Chris Short (6–7) || Bob Moorhead (0–2) || None || 9,573 || 57–66
|- style="background:#fbb"
| 124 || August 17 || @ Pirates || 1–9 || Harvey Haddix (8–5) || Jack Hamilton (6–11) || None || 13,713 || 57–67
|- style="background:#fbb"
| 125 || August 18 || @ Pirates || 2–5 || Tom Sturdivant (5–3) || Cal McLish (8–3) || Roy Face (22) || 10,611 || 57–68
|- style="background:#bfb"
| 126 || August 19 || @ Pirates || 3–2 || Chris Short (7–7) || Roy Face (8–4) || Jack Baldschun (12) || 15,680 || 58–68
|- style="background:#bfb"
| 127 || August 20 (1) || Colt .45s || 7–1 || Dallas Green (6–5) || Turk Farrell (8–16) || None || 14,601 || 59–68
|- style="background:#bbb"
| – || August 20 (2) || Colt .45s || colspan=6 | Postponed (rain); Makeup: August 21 as a traditional double-header
|- style="background:#bfb"
| 128 || August 21 (1) || Colt .45s || 5–3 || Art Mahaffey (17–10) || Bob Bruce (7–8) || None || see 2nd game || 60–68
|- style="background:#bfb"
| 129 || August 21 (2) || Colt .45s || 7–4 || Jack Hamilton (7–11) || Jim Golden (5–11) || None || 5,489 || 61–68
|- style="background:#bfb"
| 130 || August 22 || Dodgers || 5–1 || Chris Short (8–7) || Pete Richert (2–3) || None || 24,091 || 62–68
|- style="background:#fbb"
| 131 || August 23 || Dodgers || 2–4 || Johnny Podres (10–10) || Dennis Bennett (5–9) || Ron Perranoski (15) || 25,828 || 62–69
|- style="background:#fbb"
| 132 || August 24 || Giants || 0–6 || Billy O'Dell (15–11) || Cal McLish (8–4) || None || 19,454 || 62–70
|- style="background:#fbb"
| 133 || August 25 || Giants || 1–6 || Billy Pierce (12–4) || Dallas Green (6–6) || None || 16,738 || 62–71
|- style="background:#fbb"
| 134 || August 26 || Giants || 4–7 || Jack Sanford (18–6) || Art Mahaffey (17–11) || Bobby Bolin (4) || 14,855 || 62–72
|- style="background:#fbb"
| 135 || August 28 (1) || Mets || 0–2 || Al Jackson (7–17) || Chris Short (8–8) || None || see 2nd game || 62–73
|- style="background:#bfb"
| 136 || August 28 (2) || Mets || 10–1 || Dennis Bennett (6–9) || Bob L. Miller (0–11) || None || 6,572 || 63–73
|- style="background:#bfb"
| 137 || August 29 || Mets || 3–2 (10) || Cal McLish (9–4) || Jay Hook (8–15) || None || 4,822 || 64–73
|- style="background:#bfb"
| 138 || August 30 || Mets || 8–7 || Jack Baldschun (8–7) || Bob G. Miller (2–2) || None || 5,722 || 65–73
|- style="background:#bfb"
| 139 || August 31 || Pirates || 3–2 (11) || Jack Baldschun (9–7) || Earl Francis (6–8) || None || 8,191 || 66–73
|-

|- style="background:#fbb"
| 140 || September 1 || Pirates || 6–7 || Tom Sturdivant (8–3) || Jim Owens (2–4) || Roy Face (27) || 8,297 || 66–74
|- style="background:#bbb"
| – || September 2 || Pirates || colspan=6 | Cancelled (rain); Was not rescheduled
|- style="background:#bfb"
| 141 || September 3 (1) || @ Colt .45s || 3–2 || Art Mahaffey (18–11) || Turk Farrell (9–18) || None || see 2nd game || 67–74
|- style="background:#bfb"
| 142 || September 3 (2) || @ Colt .45s || 5–3 || Jack Hamilton (8–11) || Hal Woodeshick (5–16) || Dennis Bennett (3) || 17,302 || 68–74
|- style="background:#fbb"
| 143 || September 4 || @ Colt .45s || 1–4 || Bob Bruce (9–8) || Cal McLish (9–5) || None || 4,537 || 68–75
|- style="background:#bfb"
| 144 || September 7 || @ Braves || 4–3 (10) || Jack Baldschun (10–7) || Claude Raymond (5–4) || None || 6,571 || 69–75
|- style="background:#bfb"
| 145 || September 8 || @ Braves || 6–4 || Cal McLish (10–5) || Bob Hendley (10–12) || Jack Hamilton (2) || 6,099 || 70–75
|- style="background:#bfb"
| 146 || September 9 || @ Braves || 4–2 || Chris Short (9–8) || Warren Spahn (14–13) || Jack Baldschun (13) || 10,238 || 71–75
|- style="background:#fbb"
| 147 || September 12 || Braves || 0–9 || Denny Lemaster (2–4) || Art Mahaffey (18–12) || None || 5,783 || 71–76
|- style="background:#bfb"
| 148 || September 13 || Braves || 2–1 || Chris Short (10–8) || Warren Spahn (14–14) || None || 4,013 || 72–76
|- style="background:#bfb"
| 149 || September 14 || Cardinals || 2–1 || Dennis Bennett (7–9) || Lindy McDaniel (3–10) || None || 7,262 || 73–76
|- style="background:#bfb"
| 150 || September 15 || Cardinals || 5–4 || Jack Baldschun (11–7) || Bobby Shantz (6–4) || None || 4,503 || 74–76
|- style="background:#bfb"
| 151 || September 16 || Cardinals || 3–1 || Art Mahaffey (19–12) || Bob Gibson (15–13) || None || 6,388 || 75–76
|- style="background:#bfb"
| 152 || September 19 (1) || Cubs || 4–3 (6) || Chris Short (11–8) || Morrie Steevens (0–1) || None || 3,465 || 76–76
|- style="background:#bbb"
| – || September 19 (2) || Cubs || colspan=6 | Postponed (rain); Makeup: September 20 as a traditional double-header
|- style="background:#bfb"
| 153 || September 20 (1) || Cubs || 3–1 || Dennis Bennett (8–9) || Bob Buhl (11–13) || None || see 2nd game || 77–76
|- style="background:#fbb"
| 154 || September 20 (2) || Cubs || 1–4 || Cal Koonce (10–9) || Jack Hamilton (8–12) || Freddie Burdette (1) || 2,508 || 77–77
|- style="background:#bfb"
| 155 || September 21 || Reds || 8–6 || Jack Baldschun (12–7) || Joey Jay (21–14) || None || 5,726 || 78–77
|- style="background:#bfb"
| 156 || September 22 || Reds || 2–1 || Cal McLish (11–5) || Johnny Klippstein (7–5) || None || 3,837 || 79–77
|- style="background:#fbb"
| 157 || September 23 || Reds || 2–4 (10) || Dave Sisler (4–3) || Art Mahaffey (19–13) || None || 6,554 || 79–78
|- style="background:#bfb"
| 158 || September 26 || @ Cubs || 6–5 || Jack Hamilton (9–12) || Bob Buhl (11–14) || None || 930 || 80–78
|- style="background:#bfb"
| 159 || September 27 || @ Cubs || 7–0 || Dennis Bennett (9–9) || Cal Koonce (10–10) || None || 617 || 81–78
|- style="background:#fbb"
| 160 || September 28 || @ Reds || 3–7 || Sammy Ellis (2–2) || Chris Short (11–9) || Bill Henry (11) || 4,494 || 81–79
|- style="background:#fbb"
| 161 || September 30 || @ Reds || 0–4 || John Tsitouris (1–0) || Art Mahaffey (19–14) || None || 10,942 || 81–80
|-

Roster

Player stats

Batting

Starters by position 
Note: Pos = Position; G = Games played; AB = At bats; H = Hits; Avg. = Batting average; HR = Home runs; RBI = Runs batted in

Other batters 
Note: G = Games played; AB = At bats; H = Hits; Avg. = Batting average; HR = Home runs; RBI = Runs batted in

Pitching

Starting pitchers 
Note: G = Games pitched; IP = Innings pitched; W = Wins; L = Losses; ERA = Earned run average; SO = Strikeouts

Other pitchers 
Note: G = Games pitched; IP = Innings pitched; W = Wins; L = Losses; ERA = Earned run average; SO = Strikeouts

Relief pitchers 
Note: G = Games pitched; W = Wins; L = Losses; SV = Saves; ERA = Earned run average; SO = Strikeouts

Awards and honors 
 Gene Mauch, Associated Press NL Manager of the Year
 Robin Roberts, Lou Gehrig Award

All-Stars 
1962 Major League Baseball All-Star Game -first game
 Johnny Callison

1962 Major League Baseball All-Star Game -second game
 Art Mahaffey

Farm system 

Dallas-Fort Worth affiliation shared with Los Angeles Angels

Notes

References 
 1962 Philadelphia Phillies at Baseball Reference
 1962 Philadelphia Phillies at Baseball Almanac

Philadelphia Phillies seasons
Philadelphia Phillies season
Philadelph